Virender Singh may refer to:

Virender Singh (judge) (born 1954), Indian judge 
Virender Singh (wrestler, born 1970), Indian freestyle wrestler
Virender Singh (wrestler, born 1986), deaf Indian freestyle wrestler